Brent Vermeulen (born 1 January 2001) is a South African actor. His films include The Harvesters (2018), Griekwastad (2019), and Glasshouse (2021). On television, he is known for his roles in Alles Malan (2019–) and Spoorloos: Steynhof (2021).

Early life
Vermeulen was born to parents André and Suzie. He attended Durbanville Primary School in Cape Town and then Paarl Gimnasium as a boarding student. He discovered acting through a school musical, matriculating in 2019. His sister Julia also took drama as a subject.

Career
Vermeulen made his film debut while still at school opposite Alex van Dyk in the 2018 drama film The Harvesters, which screened at the Cannes Film Festival. He reunited with van Dyk the following year for the true crime film Griekwastad. He also made his television debut that year when he began playing Johan in the kykNET series Alles Malan and made an appearance as Barend Strachan in the M-Net series Trackers.

In 2021, Vermeulen joined the cast of the kykNET & kie drama Spoorloos for its third installment, Steynhof alongside Jane de Wet, with whom he had previously appeared in Griekwastad. He starred as Paul in "Paul + Zoe", the second installment of the anthology 4 Walls and Gabe in Kelsey Egan's English-language film Glasshouse.

Filmography

Film

Television

References

External links
 
 Brent Vermeulen at TVSA
 Brent Vermeulen at Artistes Personal Management

Living people
2001 births
21st-century South African male actors
Male actors from Cape Town